Swami Atmajnanananda (also written Svāmī Ātmajñānānanda, born Stuart Elkman) is a swami (monk) of the Ramakrishna Order, which he joined in 1981. He has a Ph.D. in oriental studies from the University of Pennsylvania. He is currently resident minister at the Vedanta Center of Greater Washington, DC, in Silver Spring, Maryland, USA.

He authored Jiva Gosvamin's Tattvasandarbha: A Study on the Philosophical and Sectarian Development of the Gaudiya Vaisnava Movement, published by Motilal Banarsidass in 1986 under his pre-monastic name.

Atmajnanananda was a significant critic of Jeffrey Kripal's book Kali's Child.

References

External links
Vedanta Center of Greater Washington, DC website
 Swami Atmajnanananda (English) Lecture, Boston

Monks of the Ramakrishna Mission
Living people
Year of birth missing (living people)